Haribol Prasad Gajurel (Nepali: हरिबोल प्रसाद गजुरेल) (alias Sital Kumar) is a Nepalese politician and a member of the Nepal House of Representatives, having been elected twice by the Sindhuli-2 constituency. He was also a member of the second constituent assembly, elected in 2013. He was also the Minister for Agricultural Development in the First Oli cabinet, but later resigned when his party, the Communist Party of Nepal (Maoist Centre), withdrew its support for the government.

References

Living people
Communist Party of Nepal (Maoist Centre) politicians
Government ministers of Nepal
Nepal MPs 2017–2022
Nepal Communist Party (NCP) politicians
1955 births
People from Sindhuli District
Members of the 2nd Nepalese Constituent Assembly
Communist Party of Nepal (Masal) (historical) politicians